Antonio Nibali (born 23 September 1992) is an Italian professional racing cyclist, who currently rides for UCI WorldTeam .

He is the younger brother of fellow racing cyclist Vincenzo Nibali. He was named in the startlist for the 2017 Vuelta a España. In May 2018, he was named in the startlist for the 2018 Giro d'Italia. He also rode in the Giro d'Italia in 2019 and 2020; he placed 37th overall in the latter while riding in support of his brother. In August of 2021, he was named to the start list for the Vuelta a España.

Major results
2009
 7th Trofeo Guido Dorigo
2010
 9th Trofeo Città di Loano
 10th Memorial Davide Fardelli
2013
 3rd Overall Giro Ciclistico Pesca e Nettarina di Romagna Igp
2014
 8th Trofeo Alcide Degasperi
2018
 1st Stage 7 Tour of Austria
 8th Gran Premio di Lugano
2022
 10th Overall Giro di Sicilia

Grand Tour general classification results timeline

References

External links

 

1992 births
Living people
Italian male cyclists
Sportspeople from Messina
Cyclists from Sicily